AirSWIFT (formerly Island Transvoyager) is a Filipino regional boutique airline with a permit to operate domestic scheduled and non-scheduled air transportation services. It also serves the aircraft transportation requirements of its affiliated company, El Nido Resorts.

History 

Founded in 2002 as Island Transvoyager, the company had three Dornier 228 aircraft. All of these were retired by early 2013 and replaced by ATR 42-600s. Ayala Capital Corporation acquired ownership of ITI in 2012. In October 2015, Island Transvoyager rebranded as AirSWIFT. Currently, AirSWIFT has daily flights from El Nido to Manila and Cebu.

Destinations

The company operates El Nido Airport, a private airport at El Nido, Palawan which serves as its hub. As of August 2022, AirSWIFT serves the following destinations within the Philippines:

Fleet 

As of August 2022 the AirSWIFT fleet consisted of the following aircraft:

Airports owned 
AirSWIFT is one of the two known charter airlines in Philippines which own and operate a private airport. The other is Sky Pasada. 

In Palawan, it operates El Nido Airport while it operates Sicogon Airport in Sicogon Island Carles, Iloilo.

References

External links 

Airlines of the Philippines
Companies based in Pasay
Airlines established in 2002
Philippine companies established in 2002